HSwMS Saga was a steam corvette of the Royal Swedish Navy.

Saga was used for training sailors. During the winter season she served as a depot ship for the recruit unit. Saga was used as a cadet vessel from 1878 to 1887, and from 1894 to 1909, later being used as a barracks ship. She was decommissioned in 1926. Her propeller is displayed outside the Naval Museum in Karlskrona.

Service history
In June 1902, Saga visited Sheerness.

References

Ships built in Karlskrona
Corvettes of the Swedish Navy
1877 ships